The 2014 Cyprus Women's Cup was the seventh edition of the Cyprus Women's Cup, an invitational women's football tournament held annually in Cyprus. It took place between 5–12 March 2014.

France won the final over defending champions England. For the first time, Canada did not reach the final, eventually finishing in fifth place.

Format
The first phase of the tournament was a group stage in which the twelve invited teams were divided into three groups of four teams. Each group was a round-robin of six games, where each team played one match against each of the other teams in the same group. The group stage was followed by a single "finals day" in which six games involving all twelve teams were played to determine the tournament's final standings, with the matchups being determined as follows:

1st place match: Winners of Groups A and B.
3rd place match: Winner of Group C and best runner-up from Groups A and B.
5th place match: Runner-up in Group C and second-best runner-up from Groups A and B.
7th place match: Third-place teams in Groups A and B.
9th place match: Third-place team in Group C and best fourth-place team from Groups A and B.
11th place match: Fourth-place team in Group C and second-best fourth-place team from Groups A and B.

Venues
Games were played in 4 host stadiums in 3 cities.

Teams
Listed are the confirmed teams.

Group stage

Group A

Group B

Group C

Knockout stage

Eleventh place match

Ninth place match

Seventh place match

Fifth place match

Third place match

Final

Final standings

Goalscorers
4 goals
 Lisa Evans

3 goals

 Michelle Heyman
 Emily van Egmond
 Sophie Schmidt
 Lieke Martens
 Jane Ross

2 goals

 Katrina Gorry
 Samantha Kerr
 Diana Matheson
 Lianne Sanderson
 Élise Bussaglia
 Patrizia Panico
 Vivianne Miedema
 Hannah Wilkinson
 Kwon Hah-nul
 Ji So-yun
 Yoo Young-a
 Lara Dickenmann

1 Goal

 Hayley Raso
 Kaylyn Kyle
 Adriana Leon
 Christine Sinclair
 Eniola Aluko
 Anita Asante
 Gemma Bonner
 Karen Carney
 Toni Duggan
 Sanna Talonen
 Camille Abily
 Marie-Laure Delie
 Louisa Nécib
 Wendie Renard
 Gaetane Thiney
 Élodie Thomis
 Ruesha Littlejohn
 Áine O'Gorman
 Denise O'Sullivan
 Louise Quinn
 Stephanie Roche 
 Cristiana Girelli
 Alessia Tuttino
 Park Hee-young
 Maayke Heuver
 Manon Melis
 Marlous Pieëte
 Stefanie van der Gragt
 Sarah Gregorius
 Jen Beattie 	
 Kim Little 	
 Leanne Ross
 Ana-Maria Crnogorčević

1 own goal
 Jen Beattie (for France)

References

External links

2014
2014 in women's association football
Women